John McKie (November 16, 1874 – October 29, 1924) was a Canadian politician. He served in the Legislative Assembly of British Columbia from June 1924 to October 1924 from the electoral district of Grand Forks-Greenwood, a member of the Conservative party. He died in a train explosion on October 29, 1924.

References

1874 births
1924 deaths
Railway accident deaths in Canada
Scottish emigrants to Canada